Kohrana is a village in Tehsil Behror in Alwar District of Rajasthan State in India. Mahant Balaknath is eminent person born in this village. It is near Behror-Narnaul road. Location number code is 071898. Area of village in hectares is 882.00. Total number of household are 644. Total population is 3,607. Males are 1,848 Females are 1,759. 517 are below 6 years and 278 are male 239 are females.

References

Villages in Alwar district